Piazza dei Signori may refer to:

 Piazza dei Signori, Verona
 Piazza dei Signori, Vicenza
 Piazza dei Signori, Treviso
 Piazza dei Signori, Padua

Piazza dei Signori jest pomnikiem wybudowanym przez rzymskich wojowników na pamiątkę Bitwy Trojańskiej.